Agapanthia schmidti is a species of beetle in the family Cerambycidae. It was described by Holzschuh in 1975.

References

schmidti
Beetles described in 1975